Charles William Conroy (28 April 1868 – 28 July 1944) was a member of the Queensland Legislative Assembly.

Biography
Conroy was born in Toowoomba, Queensland, the son of Michael Conroy and his wife Anne (née Murray) and was educated in Toowoomba. He moved to Roma in his twenties and worked as a clerk for the solicitor, R.H. Dyball. He then went into business as a tobacconist and stationer.

On 15 August 1898 he married Bertha Walduck (died 1964) who shared in much of her husband's public duties. He died at Roma Hospital in July 1944 and his funeral proceeded from the Roma Church of England church to the Roma Monumental Cemetery.

Public career
Conroy, for the Labor Party, won the seat of Maranoa in the Queensland Legislative Assembly at the 1920 Queensland state election and went on to represent the seat until his retirement from politics at the 1944 state election.

He was also an alderman in the Roma Shire Council, being the town's mayor in 1909-1910 and again in 1920.

References

Members of the Queensland Legislative Assembly
1868 births
1944 deaths
Australian Labor Party members of the Parliament of Queensland